Alcañón is a rare white wine grape variety from Somontano Aragon, Spain. It was previously thought to be the same variety as Macabeo, but genetic analysis has shown that they are distinct varieties. It is an authorised variety in the Somontano DOP.

Synonyms 
Alcañón is also known under the synonyms Blanco Castellano and Bobal Blanca.

References

Spanish wine
Grape varieties of Spain
White wine grape varieties